Moyamba is the capital and largest city of Moyamba District, in the Southern Province of Sierra Leone. There has been a recorded population of 11,485 in the 2004 census. The city is ethnically diverse, although the Mende people make up the majority. The city is home to the Hatford Secondary School for Girls, which is one of the elite secondary schools in Sierra Leone. The school attract some of the most gifted students from all parts of Sierra Leone, along with students abroad. The school is an all-girls secondary school, and the students are in a boarding home in the school campus. The city has a history of producing some of Sierra Leone's most prominent politicians, including the country's first president, Siaka Stevens.

Ethnicity
Moyamba is an ethnically diverse city, although the Mende make up the largest population. As with most parts of Sierra Leone, the Krio language of the  Sierra Leone Creole people is the most widely spoken language in Moyamba.

Sport
Like the rest of the country, football is the most popular sport in Moyamba. The biggest and most popular club from the city is the Yambatui Stars, which currently plays in Sierra Leone second division.

Media
Radio Modcar 94.8 is the local radio station in the city. SLBS TV and SLBS Radio are broadcast along with Sierra Leone's national radio and television stations in Moyamba.

Notable people from Moyamba
Sir Milton Margai, lead Sierra Leone to independence and was prime minister from 1962 to 1963
Sir Albert Margai, prime minister of Sierra Leone from 1964 to 1967
Siaka Stevens, president of Sierra Leone from 1971 to 1985
Banja Tejan-Sie, Sierra Leone governor general from 1967 to 1968
Madam Ella Koblo Gulama, prominent Sierra Leonean politician and the first woman to be elected in the parliament and the first woman to be elected as cabinet minister

References

Populated places in Sierra Leone
Southern Province, Sierra Leone